Stephanie Wighton (born 28 June 1990) is an Australian female professional squash player. As of July 2016, she is ranked 170 according to the PSA World rankings.

References

External links 
 

1990 births
Living people
Australian female squash players
People from Mount Gambier, South Australia
21st-century Australian women